Thousandsticks Branch is a stream in Leslie County, Kentucky, in the United States.

Thousandsticks Branch was named from the fact pioneers saw hundreds of tree stumps there like sticks.

See also
List of rivers of Kentucky

References

Rivers of Leslie County, Kentucky
Rivers of Kentucky